The following lists events that happened during the 1620s in South Africa.

Events
 1622 - The Portuguese ship, Sao João Baptista, was lost off the eastern coast of South Africa

Births

References
See Years in South Africa for list of References

History of South Africa